This is a list of Quebec television channels.

French broadcast networks
 CFTU-DT (Canal Savoir)
 Ici Radio-Canada Télé 
 TVA  (Quebecor)
 Télé-Québec
 Noovo

English broadcast channels
Quebec is predominantly francophone, with its anglophone minority centred primarily around the city of Montreal. Accordingly, Quebec has only one station affiliated with each of Canada's major English-language broadcast networks.

 CBMT-DT (CBC Television)
 CFCF-DT (CTV)
 CJNT-DT (Citytv)
 CKMI-DT (Global)

French Cable/Digital/Pay TV
 addikTV (formerly Mystère) (Quebecor)
 ARGENT
 Avis de Recherche
 Canal de l'Assemblée nationale
 Canal D
 Canal Indigo
 Canal Vie
 Le Canal Nouvelles
 Casa (Quebecor)
 Elle Fictions (formerly MusiquePlus)
 Évasion (Quebecor)
 Historia
 Ici ARTV
 Ici Explora
 Ici RDI
 Max (formerly MusiMax)
 MétéoMédia
 Prise 2 (Quebecor)
 Réseau des sports (RDS)
 RDS Info
 SériesPlus
 Shopping TVA
 Super Écran
 TATV
 TÉLÉTOON
 TV5 Québec Canada
 Unis
 Vrak
 Z

See also
List of Canadian television channels
List of Quebec television series
List of Quebec media
Lists of television channels
Television of Quebec

References

!
Quebec

fr:Liste des chaînes de télévision du Québec